The 2017 World Single Distances Speed Skating Championships was held between 9 and 12 February 2017 at the Gangneung Oval in Gangneung, South Korea.

Schedule
All times are local (UTC+9).

Medal summary

Medal table

 Host country highlighted.

Men's events

Women's events

References

External links
 World Single Distances Speed Skating Championships, 9 - 12 Feb 2017, Gangneung, Korea (entries, results and announcements)
 ISU World Single Distances Championships 2017 (results)

 
2017 Single Distances
2017 in speed skating
World Single Distances, 2017
Sports competitions in Gangneung
2017 in South Korean sport
February 2017 sports events in Asia
Speed skating